Maxine Scates is an American poet.

Life
Born and raised in Los Angeles, she received a B.A. in English from California State University, Northridge, where she studied with the poet Ann Stanford, whose selected poems Holding Our Own: The Selected Poems of Ann Stanford she later co-edited with another former student of Stanford's, the poet David Trinidad. She moved to Eugene, Oregon in 1973 to pursue an M.F.A. at the University of Oregon which she received in 1975.

She is the author of four books of poems, My Wilderness (forthcoming October 2021, University of Pittsburgh Press), Undone (New Issues 2011), Black Loam (Cherry Grove, 2005) which received the Lyre Prize and was a finalist for the Oregon Book Award for Poetry, and Toluca Street (University of Pittsburgh Press, 1989), which received the Agnes Lynch Starrett Poetry Prize, and subsequently the Oregon Book Award (Stafford/Hall Award) for Poetry.

She has taught throughout the state of Oregon, most recently at Reed College.

Her poems have appeared in such journals as Agni, The American Poetry Review, Antioch Review, Cave Wall, Crazyhorse, Hubbub, Ironwood, Massachusetts Review, Missouri Review, Ninth Letter, Ploughshares, Plume, Poetry, Prairie Schooner, The New England Review, The New Yorker, The Virginia Quarterly Review and ZYZZYVA and have received the Pushcart Prize in 2010 and 2016.

She lives in Eugene, Oregon with her husband, William Cadbury.

Awards
 1988 Agnes Lynch Starrett Poetry Prize, for Toluca Street
 1990 Oregon Book Award for Poetry
 2004 Lyre Prize for Black Loam
 2010 Pushcart Prize
 MacDowell Colony Fellow, Oregon Arts Commission and Literary Arts Fellowship
 2016 Pushcart Prize

Works
 
 "Mother's Closet", Poetry Foundation

Editor

External links 
 Official website

References

Living people
Agnes Lynch Starrett Poetry Prize winners
Reed College faculty
Lewis & Clark College faculty
1949 births
Poets from Oregon
American women poets
California State University, Northridge alumni
University of Oregon alumni
American women academics